Dyseuaresta mexicana is a species of tephritid or fruit flies in the genus Dyseuaresta of the family Tephritidae.

Distribution
United States South to Colombia & Venezuela, West Indies.

References

Tephritinae
Insects described in 1854
Diptera of South America
Diptera of North America